German submarine U-353 was a Type VIIC U-boat of Nazi Germany's Kriegsmarine during World War II. The submarine was laid down on 30 March 1940 at the Flensburger Schiffbau-Gesellschaft yard at Flensburg, launched on 11 November 1941, and commissioned on 31 March 1942 under the command of Oberleutnant zur See Wolfgang Römer. After training with the 5th U-boat Flotilla based at Kiel, U-353 was transferred to the 1st U-boat Flotilla at Brest in France for front-line service from 1 October 1942.

U-353 was sunk on her first and only combat patrol at 15:02 GMT on 16 October 1942 in the North Atlantic after being rammed and depth-charged by the destroyer , in position , while about to attack Convoy SC 104. Six of the crew were killed and 39 survived the attack.

She did not sink any ships.

Design
German Type VIIC submarines were preceded by the shorter Type VIIB submarines. U-353 had a displacement of  when at the surface and  while submerged. She had two shafts and two  propellers.

U-353 was fitted with five  torpedo tubes (four fitted at the bow and one at the stern), fourteen torpedoes, one  SK C/35 naval gun, 220 rounds, and a  C/30 anti-aircraft gun. The boat had a complement of between forty-four and sixty.

Service history

Commissioning and training
U-353 was ready for commissioning in early February 1942, but this was delayed until 31 March by ice in the Baltic Sea. Her U-Bootsabnahmekommission trials (UAK, "U-Boats Acceptance Commission") at Kiel was delayed by three weeks because of the number of U-boats already there, so she remained at Flensburg, performing exercises. The U-boat finally arrived at Kiel on about 21 April, taking the normal UAK trials in Kiel Fjord. The UAK trials lasted until about 20 May.

U-353 then proceeded to Rønne (on the Danish island of Bornholm, in the western Baltic), for silent running tests, but these were interrupted by the threat of Russian submarines. She consequently sailed to Danzig, arriving about 23 May, proceeding immediately to Königsberg, where she put into the Schichau shipyard for a few days for minor repairs. She then sailed to Gotenhafen (Gdnyia, Poland), where she spent about five days in torpedo firing exercises, and then to Hela (now Hel, Poland) for the Ausbildungsgruppe Front ("Training Group Front") technical and dive training, which lasted about four weeks. U-353 returned to Rönne for a week of silent running tests, then arrived back at Flensburg for final adjustments and crew leave on 11 July. There the boat was fitted with a Metox radar detector. In mid-August she sailed to Gdingen for tactical exercises, which lasted until early September. On 11 September U-353 arrived back at Kiel for fitting-out, fuelling, and embarked provisions and torpedoes.

Combat patrol
U-353 sailed from Kiel at 07:00 on 22 September 1942, accompanied by two other U-boats and for a short distance by two Sperrbrecher (lit. "Pathmaker", in English "Minesweeper"). She was provisioned for ten weeks and carried 130 tons of fuel oil. It was expected that she would remain at sea for just over eight weeks, before arriving at Brest, where she would join the 1st U-boat Flotilla.

She was escorted by minesweepers and Vorpostenboote ("patrol boats"). On making Skudesnes, off Stavanger, on the evening of 26 September, the escorts parted company, U-353 sailed west until she reached the 100-fathom line, then altered course northwards. The U-boat detected radar transmissions several times, and dived immediately. She continued north before altering course to the west to pass through the Rosengarten ("rose garden", the German naval slang term for a minefield) between Iceland and the Faroe Islands, encountering drifting mines several times. The U-boat then received orders from the BdU ("U-boat High Command") to proceed to a position roughly 400 miles west of Rockall.

Wolfpacks
U-353 took part in two wolfpacks, namely:
 Panther (6 – 12 October 1942)
 Leopard (12 – 16 October 1942)

Wolfpack 'Panther'
About 3 October, U-353 received another signal from the BdU reporting a convoy about 190 miles to the north-north-west, however heavy seas made reaching it difficult. About 5 October, she was ordered to abandon the attempt, and was later ordered to proceed to another position, arriving about 6 October, as one of nineteen U-boats forming the wolfpack 'Panther'.

U-353 was the seventh or eighth boat in the patrol line and remained in position for a week. On sighting a fast independently sailing ship at a range of about 4,000 yards, she altered course to intercept it, but lost contact. Early on 10 October, the U-boat sighted another ship, estimated to be of about 15,000 tons, sailing independently. The U-boat pursued her, but lost her in rapidly worsening weather, abandoning the chase and returning to the patrol line. The next day, 11 October,  reported sighting a convoy of three fast ships and three destroyers, U-353 was one of several U-boats ordered to pursue them.

Wolfpack 'Leopard'
The detached U-boats were designated wolfpack 'Leopard', but were soon ordered to change course to close a larger convoy spotted by wolfpack 'Wolf' about 400 miles to the west. At 05:00 on 12 October, U-353 spotted an independently sailing merchant ship of 4,000 to 5,000 tons, and closed to attack, firing two torpedoes from a range of 2,000 yards. The ship promptly altered course, and the U-boat fired another torpedo from her stern tube. Two loud explosions were heard, and the ship was seen to break in two and sink. U-353 surfaced and closed at full speed, only to find U-133 already there and claiming the victory. Eventually the two captains agreed that U-353s torpedoes had forced the ship to change course into U-133s line of fire, and they agreed to share the credit. Ten minutes later another U-boat was sighted, which claimed to have sunk two ships. The U-boats then parted company to search for the convoy.

About noon on 12 October, U-353 was proceeding on the surface in daylight in company with two other U-boats, when a B-24 Liberator bomber from No. 120 Squadron RAF appeared out of low cloud and attacked. U-353 crash-dived, hearing depth charges explode some distance away. After an hour she resurfaced and searched for her companions, but found nothing.

Convoy SC 104
At about 05:00 on 16 October, U-353 was proceeding at full speed on the surface in total darkness. The U-boat saw the shadows of ships all around, the nearest about five miles away. This ship, the corvette  detected the U-boat by radar, promptly closed the range and opened fire with her guns. The attack lasted for an hour before the corvette withdrew. An hour later the U-boat surfaced, and set a course to intercept the convoy.

Sinking
On detecting propeller noise, the U-boat altered course to approach the convoy. After half an hour the hydrophone operator heard faint propeller noises approaching. The U-boat altered course again and after 15 minutes the operator again reported oncoming propeller noises. The captain ordered the U-boat to rise to periscope depth. Unknown to U-353, this was the destroyer , about two miles ahead of Convoy SC 104, which had gained a firm Asdic (sonar) contact, and increased speed to 15 knots to intercept the U-boat.

Suddenly there was a series of ear-splitting explosions, as Fame dropped a pattern of 10 depth charges. The lights in U-353 went out and water entered forward and aft through the hydrophone shafts. The electric motors stopped working, all but one of the depth gauges broke, and the aft hydroplanes were put out of action. U-353 went deeper, almost out of control as water poured in through the stern torpedo tube causing her to lose trim. The U-boat blew her tanks and surfaced, and the captain ordered the crew to prepare to abandon ship.

Fame was preparing for a hedgehog attack when the U-boat surfaced. The destroyer increased speed to 18 knots and opened fire with every weapon which could bear. Fame rammed U-353 forward, her bows hitting her a glancing blow, the U-boat scraped down her starboard side, the destroyer then dropped a pattern of five depth charges when the U-boat was abreast of her stern.

The survivors of U-353s crew leapt into the sea from the sinking U-boat and swam to safety. The commander, four officers and 14 ratings were picked up by Fame, another 20 men were rescued by the Norwegian corvette . All were landed at Liverpool a few days later for interrogation and internment in a POW camp.

See also
 Convoy SC 104

References

Bibliography

External links

1941 ships
World War II submarines of Germany
German Type VIIC submarines
U-boats commissioned in 1942
U-boats sunk in 1942
U-boats sunk by British warships
U-boats sunk by depth charges
World War II shipwrecks in the Atlantic Ocean
Ships built in Flensburg
Maritime incidents in October 1942